Gordon Hynes (born 6 November 1944) is a former Australian rules footballer who played with Geelong in the VFL during the 1960s.

Hynes made his league debut in the 1963 season and ended the year as a Geelong premiership player, kicking 3 goals in the grand final. One year earlier Hynes played in Geelong's Under 19's premiership side.

After retiring from the VFL at 24 years of age, he returned to North Shore in the Geelong Football League, where he coached the Seagulls for 12 seasons between 1973 and 1984, 11 of them as playing coach, winning six premierships, the club's senior best and fairest award seven times and the league best and fairest in 1978.

Playing Achievements

Premierships
Geelong Under 19's: 1962

Geelong: (VFL/AFL) 1963

North Shore: (GDFL) 1974, 1976, 1977. (GFL) 1980, 1981.

Best & Fairest's
Geelong Under 19's: 1962

North Geelong: 1971, 1972.

North Shore: 1973, 1974, 1975, 1976, 1977, 1978, 1979.

Geelong & District Football League: 1978

Coaching Achievements

Premierships
North Shore: (GDFL) 1974, 1976, 1977. (GFL) 1980, 1981, 1983.

References

External links
 
 North Shore FC Hall of Fame Induction Poster
 Geelong Under 19's Premierships from Geelong Football Club official page.
 Woofa - A Success Story from North Shore Football Club official page.

1944 births
Living people
Australian rules footballers from Victoria (Australia)
Geelong Football Club players
Geelong Football Club Premiership players
North Geelong Football Club players
North Shore Football Club (GFL) players
One-time VFL/AFL Premiership players